Jacob Elmer Long (July 31, 1880 – April 28, 1955) was the 15th Lieutenant Governor of North Carolina from 1925 to 1929 serving under Governor Angus W. McLean.

Long was born in Yanceyville, North Carolina in 1880, the son of lawyer Jacob Alson Long. J. Elmer Long also became a lawyer after graduating from the University of North Carolina at Chapel Hill in 1903.  He served as private secretary to U.S. Rep. Charles M. Stedman and was elected to at least two terms in the North Carolina House of Representatives from Alamance County as a Democrat.

After serving one term (the maximum then allowed) as Lieutenant Governor, Long resumed the practice of law in Durham, North Carolina and served as president of the North Carolina Bar Association in 1933–1934.  

He is a distant relative of North Carolina Commissioner of Insurance Jim Long.

References
The Political Graveyard
Caswell County Lawyers
NC Manual of 1913
OurCampaigns.com

1880 births
1955 deaths
People from Yanceyville, North Carolina
Lieutenant Governors of North Carolina
Democratic Party members of the North Carolina House of Representatives
North Carolina lawyers
University of North Carolina at Chapel Hill alumni
People from Alamance County, North Carolina
20th-century American politicians
People from Durham, North Carolina
20th-century American lawyers